EU-Alert is the generic term for the European Public Warning Service based upon Cell Broadcast technology.
EU-Alert is compatible with Wireless Emergency Alerts (WEA) formerly known as the Commercial Mobile Alert System (CMAS) standard as used in the United States. Since 2012, and by default, mobile phone OSes like Android, iOS, and Windows support EU-Alert/WEA/CMAS via Cell Broadcast for public warning messages.

EU-Alert standard 
The EU-Alert standard (TS 102 900 V1.3.1) as defined by ETSI is the European Public Warning Service using the Cell Broadcast Service as a means of delivering public warning messages to the general public.

Specific countries using the EU-Alert service are identified by replacing the letters EU with the Country Identification letters in ISO 3166-1 :

 NL-Alert: The national variant of EU-Alert for the Netherlands.
 GR-Alert: The national variant of EU-Alert for Greece.
 LT-Alert: The national variant of EU-Alert for Lithuania.
 RO-Alert: The national variant of EU-Alert for Romania.
 ES-Alert: The national variant of EU-Alert for Spain (started testing in October-November 2022).
 IT-Alert: The national variant of EU-Alert for Italy (started testing in October 2020) Cell Broadcast Centres in Italy are provided by infinite-convergence a white-label CBC partner of Nokia as Nokia does not own a Cell Broadcast System they depend on a third party.
 FR-Alert: The national variant of EU-Alert for France. (started testing in May 2022)  The beginning of the national utilization is planned for the end of June 2022. 
 DE-Alert : The national variant of EU-Alert for Germany. The forecasted commissioning date is no later than February 23, 2023. 

Dependent on the country legislation there are 5 types of Public Warning Service (PWS) messages one can receive on the mobile device. They're grouped into Cell Broadcast headings and channels, and include:
 Extreme threats: Classified as threats to your life and property, like an impending catastrophic weather event (hurricane, tsunami, typhoon, flooding), disease epidemic warnings or terrorist attacks.
 Severe threats: Less serious than the extreme threats, these could be the same types of situations, but on a smaller scale — stay safe, but no need to pack up the car and head for the hills.
 EU-Amber, Amber alerts: These are specific alerts aimed at locating a missing child. 
 EU-Info, Public Safety Messages to convey essential, recommended actions that can save lives or property (e.g. emergency shelter locations or a boil water order).
 EU-Exercise, Test messages for national/regional/local purposes.

In countries that have selected Cell Broadcast as the technology to submit public warning messages up to 70%- 85% of the population older than 12 year receive the public warning verification message within seconds after the government authorities have submitted the message. See as an example Emergency Mobile Alert (New Zealand), NL-Alert (Netherlands) and Wireless Emergency Alerts (USA). Cell Broadcast is since 2012 supported by the default messaging app in Android, iOS and Windows 10.

EU Legislation 
As per 11 December 2018, the Council of the European Union has adopted the new Directive on European Electronic Communications Code (EECC). Under the new Directive, all EU member states will also have to set up a public warning system to protect citizens. This system will send alerts to all citizens and visitors mobile phones in a specific area in the event of a natural disaster, terrorist attack or other major emergency in their area.

The mandatory implementation of the public warning system will have to be in place by 21 June 2022 for each EU member state (Full text of the European Electronic Communications Code).

Requirements under the Legislation:
According to the directive a Public Warning System (PWS) must be able to:

 Target the affected population by specific geography so as not to cause widespread panic
 Reach a high percentage of people in the targeted area, not just residents but roaming visitors using their native language
 Send messages in real-time, within seconds and with a high degree of reliability
 Send message without the need for the public to have to opt-in
 The transmission of public warning messages should be free of charge for end-users not just residents but also roaming visitors

BEREC guidelines 
According to the Article 110(2) EECC, by 21 June 2020, BEREC must publish guidelines on how to assess whether the effectiveness of public warning systems under Article 110(2) EECC is equivalent to the effectiveness of those systems under the Article 110(1) EECC.

Alternative solutions 

Possible alternative for EU-Alert to use other electronic communications services, such as location based SMS or apps. However, several conditions must be met according to the new European Electronic Communications Code Legislation:

 As efficient as network-based technologies
 Reception of the alert should be easy
 Information to all visitors entering the country
 Transmission of the alert is free to the user
 Comply with privacy rules

Downloadable Mobile Applications 

There are several downloadable mobile applications on the market that often warn on natural catastrophes; however, these are often not of official, but part of private initiatives that replicate information from state agencies.

All downloadable mobile applications have the issue that they are highly affected by traffic load as they require mobile data usage; therefore, especially in case of a disaster when load spikes of data (Social media, Voice and Mobile app) tend to significantly slowdown mobile networks, as multiple terrorist attacks showed.

Moreover, downloadable Mobile Apps needs to be downloaded by subscribers and the experience over the years in many countries is that only a fraction of the population will take the effort to download and use an Emergency Mobile app that is only activated a few times in a year. Examples are in Germany with 1.500.000 downloads of the Katwarn and NINA mobile application  reaching a maximum of 2.5M people in Germany (<3% of the German population) and France only 500.000 downloads of the SAIP mobile application (<1% of the French population) despite large investments in application development and marketing. In France because of the limited success of the downloadable Mobile App SAIP (Système d’Alerte et d’Information des Populations) the service has been stopped as of June 2018.

Location based SMS 
As far as the network and the end user is concerned, a Location-Based-SMS (LB-SMS) message is simply a normal SMS message which is sent to a subset of the Mobile Network's attached devices, which happen to be in a particular geographical area. In order to achieve this for some mobile network topologies however, the network must maintain a database of all mobile devices in the target location for potential Public Warning Service messages. In other words, for all areas that the Mobile anticipates potentially delivering LB-SMS messages into, a list of all users currently located in those areas must be kept up to date at all times.

While mobile networks require knowledge of subscribers’ locations for normal operation, this is usually not maintained at all times at the granularity of the single cell level. Therefore, an LB-SMS implementation will usually require the deployment of a Mobile Location Cente (MLC). The methods used by the MLC to track mobile devices as they move around the network are not standardised and are subject to a certain level of inaccuracy. Some MLCs track device location to the cell level, whereas other MLC providers claim to fix device location to a greater level of accuracy. Depending on the level of location granularity stored in the MLC, the precision of targeting will vary. There may be privacy implications in tracking user locations in this manner that should be considered.

Aside from the location specific aspect, the principle difference between CB and LB-SMS services is that the mobile network for location based SMS must carry each recipient's message separately, since the SMS standards do not have a ‘one-to-many’ or a broadcast capability.

Based upon last years experience the Swedish Civil Contingencies Agency concluded in a report published in May 2018 that in case of serious events it's extremely unlikely that Public Warning Messages via SMS will work and will be delivered in a timely manner (less than 1 minute).

Disadvantages 
Disadvantages to use location based SMS in national public warning systems are:

 No international recognized telecommunication standardization body has defined or will define a standard for location based SMS for Public Warning Services.
 Scalability. While mobile networks are dimensioned to carry millions of messages per day, MNOs assume a relatively flat distribution across the network in terms of both time and location. In other words, the average number of messages per second in a given cell is relatively low even in a busy network. In some alerting use cases however (for example notifying all users in a particular area by SMS) it would be possible for the radio access network to be flooded by SMS messages. In this case, messages which cannot be delivered on the first attempt are usually queued up on the MNO SMSC for further delivery attempts. In the worst case, the mobile network could take hours to deliver all queued warning messages.
 Delivery time of Location Based SMS warning messages to groups of people in the Geo-target area are long and are depending on the number of people present in the area, it can take up to several hours to reach 300.000 people in a city e.g. in the May 2018 Sweden case and in the September 2019 Portugal case.
 Due to the nature of international SMS routing (SMS Home routing). It should also be noted that LB SMS messages will often not reach inbound roamers as delivery of Short code based messages abroad are blocked by the home operator due to roaming charging agreement (AA19).
 The granularity of an LB-SMS warning message will depend on the accuracy of the MLC in the MNOs network, usually a single cell which has radius between 3 km and 25 km.
 LB-SMS warning messages will not produce notifications sounds or a ringtone and vibration different than an ordinary SMS message, thus end users could easily overlook warning messages.  
 LB SMS messages can be easily faked and would require the deployment of security devices e.g. SMS firewall on each mobile operator international SS7 signaling links. 
 When sending an LB-SMS a delivery receipt could be requested upon message submission to the MNOs SMSC. This receipt provides information about the delivery of the message to the end user device only, with no indication whether the message has been read or not. However, these delivery receipt messages may increase the network load for a given alerting event, the impact of which should be considered.

See also
Cell Broadcast
Reverse 1-1-2
NL-Alert (Netherlands)
Wireless Emergency Alerts (USA)
Alert Ready (Canada)
Emergency Mobile Alert (New Zealand)

References

Sources

 
 

Emergency Alert System
Public safety
Emergency communication
2012 establishments in the European Union